

2005 Coahuila state election

On September 24 elections took place in the Mexican state of Coahuila to elect its governor, deputies in the state legislature and presidents for the 38 municipios the state is divided in.

Results
With 98% of polling stations accounted for by September 25 the results are:

Governor
 Humberto Moreira (Institutional Revolutionary Party, PRI), had 55.5% of the vote.
 Jorge Zermeño (National Action Party, PAN), had 33%.
 Juan Pablo Rodríguez  (Democratic Revolution Party, PRD), had 3% of the vote.
 Ramón Díaz Avila (Labor Party, PT), had 1.3% of the vote.
 Ana Patricia Reynoso Alvarado (Green Party), had 0.66% of the vote.

Municipal Presidents
 PRI. 28 (of 38).

State legislature
 PRI. 16 through majority for a total of 20.
 PAN. 4 through majority for a total of 8.
 PRD. 2.
 PVEM. 2.
 PT. 1.

Voter turnout
The voter turnout was considered relatively high at 52%

External links
  Official site  of the Electoral Federal Institute of Mexico (IFE).
 Official site of the government of Coahuila.

News articles
 PRI snaps up win in Coahuila state article on El Universal.
  Elección sin sorpresas en Coahuila; gana el priísta Humberto Moreira ("An election without surprises in Coahuila, Humbarto Moreira is the winner") article on La Jornada.
  Reparten plurinominales en Coahuila; dan constancias ("Plurinominals are distributed; certificates are given") article on El Universal.

Election
Coahuila